Veritas (Latin: truth) was a political party in the United Kingdom, formed in 2005 by Robert Kilroy-Silk following a split from the UK Independence Party (UKIP). Kilroy-Silk served as party leader through the 2005 General Election. He was succeeded by Patrick Eston, who resigned in 2008 citing frustrations of his efforts to reform the party. The party merged into the English Democrats in 2015.

Veritas had no representation in the Parliament of the United Kingdom, although it had members serve in the European Parliament and the London Assembly, elected as UKIP members and defecting upon Veritas' formation. At the time of its merger, the party had not put forward General Election candidates since 2005.

Formation
Robert Kilroy-Silk, a former Labour shadow cabinet member and television presenter, was elected as a UKIP Member of the European Parliament in the 2004 European Parliament election for the East Midlands region. His ambition to attain the leadership of that party was announced in October 2004, but it proved very unpopular within the party. Instead of risking disciplinary action for continuing this action, Kilroy-Silk resigned the party whip, while remaining a full member and asserting his continued challenge. The plan ultimately failed, and Kilroy-Silk finally resigned from the party – as had been long expected – on 20 January 2005. Rumours circulated immediately that Kilroy-Silk was set to form his own party, fuelled by the registration of the domain name "veritasparty.com" a month earlier. An earlier rumour suggested that he had been in negotiations with the English Democrats to join and lead their party.

Veritas – Latin for "truth" – was officially founded in a press conference on 2 February, during which Kilroy-Silk proclaimed "unlike the old parties, we shall be honest, open and straight", devoid of the other parties' "lies and spin". There were a number of defections from UKIP to the new party. They included UKIP London Assembly member Damian Hockney, who became deputy leader.

At the time of formation, its primary policy was opposition to immigration to the United Kingdom. It was perceived to be more specific than UKIP's general euroscepticism, and almost to the point of Veritas being labelled a single-issue party. Kilroy-Silk also proposed support for the introduction of flat tax in opposition to the existing system of income tax bands varying with income. Kilroy-Silk's preferred figure was 22%, the "basic rate" band in which most UK citizens fell at the time.

The party was immediately lambasted as nothing more than a vanity vehicle for Kilroy-Silk, and was nicknamed "Vanitas" by former allies.

2005 election
The first test of Veritas' ambitions was the general election on 5 May 2005 where it had hoped to overtake UKIP as the primary party opposing the European Union. Although The Times newspaper had suggested that Veritas hoped to run candidates in every constituency in Great Britain, the party ended up fielding 65 candidates in England and Wales, polling 40,481 votes, an average of 623 (1.5%).

Kilroy-Silk contested the constituency of Erewash in Derbyshire. He came fourth with 2,957 votes (5.8%); Liz Blackman was elected for Labour with 22,472. No Veritas candidates were elected; Kilroy-Silk was the only one to save his deposit.

In the subsequent Cheadle by-election on 14 July 2005 Les Leggett of Veritas polled 218 votes (0.6%).

Aftermath of 2005 general election
In the wake of the poor showing in the general election, it was reported that there were many resignations from the party. Some discontented party members came to oppose Kilroy-Silk and formed the Veritas Members Association (VMA).  One of its founders, Ken Wharton, challenged Kilroy-Silk for the leadership on 12 July 2005, during the Cheadle by-election campaign but his challenge faltered due to ill health. Kilroy-Silk resigned as party leader on 29 July.  In a press statement he said "It was clear from the general election result – and more recently that of the Cheadle by-election – that the electors are content with the old parties and that it would be virtually impossible for a new party to make a significant impact given the nature of our electoral system.  We tried and failed". Further resignations included that of his chief-of-staff David Soutter and deputy leader Damian Hockney. Hockney and London Assembly Veritas representative Peter Hulme-Cross (who, like Hockney, had defected from UKIP) subsequently formed the One London party.

A leadership election was held in September 2005. Acting leader Patrick Eston defeated Foreign Affairs Spokesperson Colin Brown, and former boxer Winston McKenzie on a 22% turnout.  This, combined with a poor turnout at the party's first Annual General Meeting, is believed to have brought about the subsequent resignation of Brown and the founders of the VMA. Eston appointed a new party chairman, Alan Ainscow, who resigned from that post and the party in November.  As defections and resignations continued, a number of members and former members from Veritas and UKIP, including Anthony Bennett and Ken Wharton, formed a new party, the Popular Alliance in March 2006.  Eston appointed a deputy, Howard Martin, who was the main Veritas Party spokesperson, and seemed determined to continue with the party, despite the depletion of the Veritas membership.

2005–15
In the 2006 local elections, Veritas stood four candidates: two each in Kingston-upon-Hull and Bolton. They polled an average of 98 votes each (3.5% of the total). In the 2007 elections, Veritas stood three candidates: two in English council elections and one – Iain James Sheldon in the Mid and West Wales Region for the Welsh Assembly, who received 502 votes (0.2% of the total).

In the summer of 2007, Patrick Eston contacted the leadership of other parties with similar political positions with a view to organising a meeting to discuss co-operation. While all parties were being contacted a later meeting was being arranged for September between Eston and the leaders of the Freedom Party and United Kingdom Popular Democrats who had shown interest. On 15 June 2008 Patrick Eston announced that he could not take the Veritas Party in the direction he wanted and so would be resigning the party leadership.  In a resignation letter to the party membership he said:
"I have come to the reluctant conclusion that the only way a new political party can move forward is for one person to have complete control and take all the decisions. However, I believe that members must have a say on whether that person stays as leader on a yearly basis. A sort of benevolent dictator that members can remove yearly if they so wish."

Therese Muchewicz, Party Secretary, served as Acting Leader until leadership elections in October 2008. She was subsequently elected as the new Party Leader. The party put forward no candidates in the 2010 or 2015 general elections. It was subsequently announced that Veritas would merge into the English Democrats.

See also

 Alliance for Democracy (UK)
 English Democrats

References

 
2005 establishments in the United Kingdom
2015 disestablishments in the United Kingdom
Political parties disestablished in 2015
Political parties established in 2005
Eurosceptic parties in the United Kingdom
Political schisms
UK Independence Party breakaway groups
Defunct political parties in England
English Democrats